Johan Letzelter (born 19 September 1984) is a French professional footballer who plays as a defender.

References

Johan Letzelter profile at foot-national.com

1984 births
Living people
Sportspeople from Montreuil, Seine-Saint-Denis
French footballers
Association football defenders
Chamois Niortais F.C. players
AS Moulins players
Calais RUFC players
Ligue 2 players
French expatriate footballers
Expatriate footballers in India
Expatriate footballers in Cyprus
Mumbai City FC players
Othellos Athienou F.C. players
Alki Oroklini players
Indian Super League players
Cypriot Second Division players
Footballers from Seine-Saint-Denis